Paul Cecil Hayward (11 January 1954 – 9 May 1992) was a professional rugby league footballer who played for the Newtown Jets between 1973 and 1978.

Sporting career
Paul Hayward played 73 first grade games for the Newtown Jets during his 6 seasons with the club, scoring 14 tries and kicking 43 goals. 

Originally a South Sydney junior league player from the Waterloo Waratahs club, he later represented a combined Sydney representative side that toured New Zealand in 1976 playing half-back. Paul Hayward had been selected to represent Australia as a boxer at the 1976 Summer Olympics in Montreal. Under the Olympic rules of that time, he was disqualified from competing after he turned professional.

Arrest and incarceration
Hayward was the brother-in-law of convicted criminal Neddy Smith. After the football season for 1978 had ended, Neddy Smith sent Hayward to Bangkok with Warren Fellows to arrange a shipment of heroin. On 11 October 1978, Hayward and Fellows were arrested at the Montien Hotel in Bangkok when a suitcase containing heroin was found in his room. He and Fellows were convicted in Thailand, alongside William Sinclair, for attempting to export 8.4 kilograms of heroin to Australia.

Paul Hayward received a 30-year sentence while Warren Fellows received life. Hayward was imprisoned in Lard Yao men's prison in Klong Prem Central Prison before being moved to Bangkwang. After being transferred back to Lard Yao he was released on 7 April 1989, after being granted a royal pardon. He returned to Sydney, via Perth shortly afterwards.

Decline and death
Hayward became a heroin user during his time in prison and contracted HIV.

On Saturday 9 May 1992, Hayward was home with his family when he collapsed in the bathroom about 3pm, a police spokeswoman said. Ambulance officers tried unsuccessfully to resuscitate him and he was announced dead on arrival at Canterbury Hospital. Later it was pronounced that he died of a heroin overdose. He was survived by his wife Gail and his three children.

References

Further reading
 Fellows, W., Marx, J., The Damage Done, Pan Macmillan Australia 1997, 

1954 births
1992 deaths
Australian drug traffickers
Australian people imprisoned abroad
Australian rugby league players
Criminals from New South Wales
Deaths by heroin overdose in Australia
Newtown Jets players
Prisoners and detainees of Thailand
Rugby league players from Sydney
Rugby league halfbacks